Olivia Merry (born 16 March 1992) is a New Zealand field hockey player who plays for the national team. She competed in the women's hockey tournament at the  where she won a bronze medal. She also attended the 2018 Gold Coast Commonwealth Games where she and her team won gold.

References

External links
 

1992 births
Living people
New Zealand female field hockey players
Commonwealth Games bronze medallists for New Zealand
Field hockey players at the 2014 Commonwealth Games
Field hockey players at the 2016 Summer Olympics
Olympic field hockey players of New Zealand
Field hockey players from Christchurch
Commonwealth Games medallists in field hockey
Female field hockey forwards
Commonwealth Games gold medallists for New Zealand
Field hockey players at the 2018 Commonwealth Games
Field hockey players at the 2020 Summer Olympics
Field hockey players at the 2022 Commonwealth Games
20th-century New Zealand women
21st-century New Zealand women
Medallists at the 2014 Commonwealth Games
Medallists at the 2018 Commonwealth Games